Tephrodornis is a bird genus usually placed in the Vangidae.

There are four species:
 Large woodshrike, Tephrodornis gularis  The scientific name of this is in dispute, and it is commonly referred to as T. gularis. or T. virgatus.
 Malabar woodshrike, Tephrodornis sylvicola
 Common woodshrike, Tephrodornis pondicerianus
 Sri Lanka woodshrike, Tephrodornis affinis

References

 
Shrikes
Bird genera
Taxonomy articles created by Polbot